Condica sutor, or the cobbler, is a species of moth in the family Noctuidae (the owlet moths). It is found in North America.

The MONA or Hodges number for Condica sutor is 9699.

References

Further reading

External links

 

Condicinae
Articles created by Qbugbot
Moths described in 1852